The Avenue of the Saints is a  highway in the Midwestern United States that connects St. Louis, Missouri and St. Paul, Minnesota.

Route description

Missouri
The southern end of the Avenue of the Saints is at exit 28A of Interstate 64 (I‑64) /U.S. Route 40 (US 40), which is also the southern end of its concurrency with US 61. The Avenue of the Saints heads west, to Chesterfield, crossing I-270. Here, the Avenue of the Saints turns northwest, crosses the Missouri River via the Daniel Boone Bridge. In Wentzville, the route interchanges with I-70. The western end of I‑64 and the northern end of the concurrency with US 40 is here. The Avenue of the Saints continues north as just US 61, intersects with the western end of I-72 in Hannibal, reaches the northern terminus of its concurrency with US 61, then crosses the Des Moines River into Iowa.

The Avenue of the Saints is co-signed with Missouri Route 27 to the Iowa state line.

Iowa
In Iowa, the Avenue of the Saints is a  highway, which begins in Lee County where Missouri Route 27 crosses the Des Moines River, and ends at the Minnesota state line in Worth County, concurrent with Interstate 35. Construction of the Avenue of the Saints corridor in Iowa was completed on May 23, 2006.

This is also the location of the southern end of its concurrency with I‑380, and this concurrency terminates in Waterloo. Near Floyd, US 218 splits off, just after the route starts a concurrency with US 18, running west to its intersection with I-35, where the route turns north again and runs into Minnesota.

In 2001, the Iowa Department of Transportation designated the Avenue of the Saints as Iowa 27. Prior to its creation, motorists wanting to travel the Avenue through Iowa had to follow a lengthy list of directions: (heading north from Missouri) Iowa 394, US 218, I‑380, US 20, Iowa 58, US 218 (again), US 18 and I‑35.

As with many rural expressways in Iowa, the Avenue of the Saints has exit numbers in that state. The exit numbers correspond to the underlying U.S. Highway or Interstate Highway – US 218, I-380, US 20, US 18 and I‑35. The section along Iowa 58 in Cedar Falls has no exit numbers, and the separate section south of Donnellson has one numbered exit—the northbound one to US 218 south—based on Iowa 27's mileage.

Minnesota

In Minnesota, the Avenue of the Saints is officially routed along I-35 and I-35E for the entirety of its length in that state, but is not marked anywhere within the state. The route runs straight north, crosses I-90 in Albert Lea, and runs to its northern end in St. Paul, shortly after crossing the Mississippi River via the Lexington Bridge.

History

The Avenue of the Saints was the concept of businessman Ernest Hayes of Mount Pleasant, Iowa who in the 1980s envisioned a four-lane highway between St. Paul and St. Louis. It was named by Gary Smith, who at the time was Executive Director of the Southeast Iowa Regional Planning Commission. Smith and Hayes convened a group of area business and political leaders, who organized an effort to convince the Iowa Department of Transportation to study the idea, which they did in 1988. Several politicians endorsed the idea, including then-mayor Tom Vilsack of Mount Pleasant, Senator Chuck Grassley of Iowa, and Congressmen David Nagle and Fred Grandy of Iowa and Dick Gephardt of Missouri.

By the end of 1989, four possible routes for the Avenue of the Saints were under consideration by the Federal Highway Administration. Two of the rejected routes would have followed US 52 and US 63 from St. Paul through Rochester, Minnesota, to Waterloo, Iowa. The third rejected route would have followed US 61 from St. Paul through La Crosse, Wisconsin, and Dubuque, Iowa to Davenport, Iowa and US 67 from Davenport, crossing the Mississippi River through western Illinois to Alton, Illinois and crossing the Mississippi and Missouri rivers to St. Louis.

In 1990 the FHWA chose its route for the Avenue of the Saints: the signed highway would follow the existing Interstate 35 from St. Paul to a point south of Clear Lake, Iowa; U.S. Route 18 to Charles City, Iowa; U.S. Route 218 to Cedar Falls, Iowa; U.S. Route 20 and Iowa Highway 58 around Cedar Falls and Waterloo, Iowa; Interstate 380 from Waterloo through Cedar Rapids to Interstate 80 near Coralville, Iowa and Iowa City, Iowa; U.S. Route 218 to Donnellson, Iowa; Iowa Highway 394 and Route B to Wayland, Missouri; and Interstate 64 and U.S. Route 61 from Wayland to St. Louis.

The Intermodal Surface Transportation Efficiency Act of 1991 made the Avenue of the Saints an official "high-priority corridor," and signs were put along the route by the end of the year. At that time the only four-lane segments were I‑35, I‑380, and I‑64; US 20 around Waterloo; US 218 from I‑80 to Iowa 22 near Riverside, Iowa; and two segments of US 61 in Missouri (from La Grange to New London and from Bowling Green to St. Louis). As a cost-saving measure, the government decided to build the Avenue of the Saints to expressway standards—with intersections at rural roads—rather than to full freeway standards. Freeway segments would be built around cities that needed to be bypassed.

After the routing was approved, both Iowa and Missouri began constructing new four-lane segments. Iowa opened bypasses around Waverly (1998), Mason City (1999), Charles City (2000), Mount Pleasant (2001), and Donnellson (2004). A four-lane link between I‑35 and I‑380 was completed with the opening of a segment near Nashua in November 2003. Missouri completed four-lane segments from New London to Bowling Green in November 2000, and from Canton to La Grange in 2003.

In 2001, the Iowa Department of Transportation gave the Avenue of the Saints its own highway number: Highway 27 (Iowa 27). The number was added as an additional number to the existing routes; however, after the Donnellson bypass opened in 2004, Iowa Highway 394 was decommissioned and Iowa 27 is now a stand-alone highway south of the split with US 218. A new four-lane bridge across the Des Moines River was opened at the end of 2004, replacing an existing toll bridge operated by the Wayland Special Road District. A new four-lane road between the bridge and US 61 south of Wayland, Missouri opened on the same day; it was numbered by Missouri as Route 27 to match Iowa's number for the Avenue of the Saints.

In June 2005, a four-lane segment from the end of the Mount Pleasant bypass to the junction with Iowa Highway 16 east of Houghton was opened to four lanes of traffic. The segment of Iowa 27 between the split with US 218 and the Des Moines River bridge opened to four lanes on August 25, 2005. The last remaining segment in Iowa was opened to traffic on May 23, 2006.

On July 25, 2008, the final  of highway between the Lewis—Clark county line and Wayland, Missouri, was open to four-lane traffic. A ceremony was held at the intersection of US 61 and Route 27 to commemorate the completion of the four-lane highway in Missouri. The Avenue of the Saints is now complete from St. Paul to suburban St. Louis.

Future construction
Ongoing construction projects and future proposals along the Avenue of the Saints include:

 The upgrading of US 61 to interstate standards from I‑70 in Wentzville to Route 47 in Troy, Missouri. In 2007, an interchange was installed at Route C in Moscow Mills, Missouri. Proposals include installing interchanges at Route U in Moscow Mills and South Lincoln Drive just south of Troy.
 Missouri Department of Transportation has published initial maps for the Hannibal Expressway, a bypass around Hannibal, Missouri. According to the maps, the Hannibal Expressway would depart from US 61 south of Hannibal, travel in a northwesterly direction toward the Rocket Junction where it would intersect with US 36/I-72 and US 24 West. The "Hannibal Expressway" project is unfunded. There are seven stoplights along US 61 in Hannibal: Red Devil Road/Warren Barrett Drive, Market Street (Business 61), Highway MM (Business 36), West Ely Road, I‑72/US 36, Stardust Drrive/Pirate Pride, and Route 168.
 The Iowa Department of Transportation has plans to rebuild the Avenue of the Saints interchange with I‑80 and I‑380/US 218/Iowa 27 in Coralville. As the Eastern Iowa region has grown, traffic has increased, and the current arrangement of the interchange with its cloverleaf ramps has been deemed unsafe. The Iowa Department of Transportation proposes to rebuilt the interchange as a turbine interchange, which will eliminate weaving. The project is scheduled to begin in 2020.

Exit list

See also

References

External links

 High-Priority Corridors: The Avenue of the Saints
 Missouri Department of Transportation: Avenue of the Saints
 Google Map of "Avenue of the Saints" Route
 OpenStreetMap Map of "Avenue of the Saints" Route

Roads in Iowa
Roads in Minnesota
Roads in Missouri
Expressways in the United States
Interstate 35
U.S. Route 61
Transportation in St. Louis County, Missouri
Transportation in St. Charles County, Missouri
Transportation in Lincoln County, Missouri
Transportation in Pike County, Missouri
Transportation in Ralls County, Missouri
Transportation in Marion County, Missouri
Transportation in Lewis County, Missouri
Transportation in Clark County, Missouri
Transportation in Lee County, Iowa
Transportation in Henry County, Iowa
Transportation in Washington County, Iowa
Transportation in Johnson County, Iowa
Transportation in Linn County, Iowa
Transportation in Benton County, Iowa
Transportation in Buchanan County, Iowa
Transportation in Black Hawk County, Iowa
Transportation in Bremer County, Iowa
Transportation in Chickasaw County, Iowa
Transportation in Floyd County, Iowa
Transportation in Cerro Gordo County, Iowa
Transportation in Worth County, Iowa
Transportation in Freeborn County, Minnesota
Transportation in Steele County, Minnesota
Transportation in Rice County, Minnesota
Transportation in Scott County, Minnesota
Transportation in Dakota County, Minnesota
Transportation in Ramsey County, Minnesota